Philippe Vercruysse (born 28 January 1962 in Saumur, Maine-et-Loire) is a French former footballer who played as a midfielder.

International career
Vercruysse earned a total number of twelve international caps (one goal) for the France national team  during the 1980s and was a member of the team in the 1986 FIFA World Cup.

Honours
Marseille
Division 1: 1988–89, 1989–90, 1990–91
European Cup runner-up: 1990–91
Coupe de France runner-up: 1990–91

References

External links
 
  French Football Federation Profile
 Profile - FC Metz

1962 births
Living people
People from Saumur
Sportspeople from Maine-et-Loire
French footballers
Association football midfielders
France international footballers
RC Lens players
Olympique de Marseille players
Nîmes Olympique players
FC Girondins de Bordeaux players
FC Metz players
FC Sion players
Étoile Carouge FC players
Ligue 1 players
1986 FIFA World Cup players
French expatriate sportspeople in Switzerland
Expatriate footballers in Switzerland
French expatriate sportspeople in Saudi Arabia
Expatriate footballers in Saudi Arabia
French expatriate footballers
Al Nassr FC players
Saudi Professional League players